"The Finest" is a song by American band the S.O.S. Band. It is the fifth track on their sixth studio album, Sands of Time, and is one of the group's last songs to feature the vocals of original lead singer Mary Davis. Labelmate and fellow R&B singer Alexander O'Neal shares vocals with Mary Davis during the bridge. "The Finest" was released as a single in 1986.

Chart performance
"The Finest" was a success on the US Hot Black Singles chart, reaching number two and was their last entry on the Billboard Hot 100, where it peaked at number 44. On the US dance chart, "The Finest" peaked at number eight, and was also their second top-20 hit on the UK Singles Chart, reaching number 17.

Track listings
7-inch single
 "The Finest" – 4:35
 "I Don't Want Nobody Else" – 4:19

12-inch single
 "The Finest" (extended version) – 6:38
 "The Finest" (instrumental) – 6:17
 "The Finest" (a cappella) – 2:05

Charts

"Finest Dreams"

In 2003, English mashup producer Richard X covered "The Finest" as "Finest Dreams", featuring vocals from American R&B singer-songwriter Kelis. This version is a mash-up with backing based upon an instrumental remix of the Human League track "The Things That Dreams Are Made Of".

The song was released on August 11, 2003, in the United Kingdom as the third single from Richard X's debut album, Richard X Presents His X-Factor Vol. 1. The single peaked at number 8 on the UK Singles Chart the week ending August 23, 2003, and also reached number 35 in Ireland. The music video was directed by Oli Goldsmith.

Track listings
UK CD and 12-inch single, Australian CD single
 "Finest Dreams" (featuring Kelis) – 4:14
 "Finest Dreams" (Part Two featuring Kelis) – 5:15
 "Music for an Imaginary Mobile Phone Commercial" – 3:05

European CD single
 "Finest Dreams" (featuring Kelis) – 4:14
 "Finest Dreams" (Part Two featuring Kelis) – 5:15

Charts

Release history

References

External links
 The Finest at Discogs

1986 singles
1986 songs
2003 singles
2003 songs
Kelis songs
Mashup songs
The S.O.S. Band songs
Song recordings produced by Jimmy Jam and Terry Lewis
Song recordings produced by Richard X
Songs written by Jimmy Jam and Terry Lewis
Tabu Records singles
Virgin Records singles